Marcel Granollers and David Marrero were the defending champions, but Granollers chose not to participate this year. Marrero played alongside Nenad Zimonjić, but lost in the quarterfinals to Elias and Mikael Ymer.

Julian Knowle and Philipp Petzschner won the title, defeating Sander Arends and Matwé Middelkoop in the final, 6–2, 3–6, [10–7].

Seeds

Draw

Draw

External links
 Main Draw

Swedish Open - Doubles
2017 Doubles